John Cavadus Whitehead (July 10, 1948 – May 11, 2004) was an American singer and songwriter. He was best known as one of the key members of the Philadelphia International record label, and was one-half of the successful team of McFadden & Whitehead with Gene McFadden.

McFadden and Whitehead wrote many hits for Philadelphia International artists such as The O'Jays and Harold Melvin & the Blue Notes, and had their own hit with "Ain't No Stoppin' Us Now" in 1979.

He was the father of both members of mid 1990s duo the Whitehead Brothers, and received an LL.D. from Bates College.

Death
On May 11, 2004, John Cavadus Whitehead was fatally shot, possibly in a case of mistaken identity, while fixing a car outside his home in Philadelphia. Another man with him at the time suffered light injuries from the multiple shots fired by two gunmen, who fled the scene. As of 2013, the murder remains unsolved. Whitehead was 55 years old and had converted to Islam in 1996 and is buried in Mount Moriah Cemetery in Philadelphia.

See also
List of unsolved murders

References

External links
Grave
Obituary

1948 births
2004 deaths
2004 murders in the United States
20th-century American composers
20th-century African-American musicians
21st-century African-American people
African-American songwriters
African-American Muslims
American soul musicians
Burials at Mount Moriah Cemetery (Philadelphia)
Converts to Islam
Deaths by firearm in Pennsylvania
Male murder victims
Murdered African-American people
American murder victims
Musicians from Philadelphia
People murdered in Pennsylvania
Record producers from Pennsylvania
Songwriters from Pennsylvania
Unsolved murders in the United States